

Portugal
 Angola – Military junta (1782-84)
 Macau –
 D. Francisco de Castro, Governor of Macau (1781–83)
 Bernardo Aleixo de Lemos e Faria, Governor of Macau (1783–88)

Colonial governors
Colonial governors
1783